Abhay Manohar Sapre (born 28 August 1954, Seoni) is a former Judge of Supreme Court of India. He had earlier served as the Chief Justice of Gauhati High Court from 19 October 2013 to 12 August 2014 and as the first Chief Justice of Manipur High Court from 23 March 2013 to 18 October 2013 and he also served as former Judge of Chhattisgarh High Court,  Rajasthan High Court and Madhya Pradesh High Court also.

Education
Sapre studied at Government Arts College, Jabalpur.

Career
Born on 28 August 1954. He was enrolled as an Advocate on 21 January 1978. He practiced on Civil, Constitutional and Labour sides in the Madhya Pradesh High Court. He was elevated as an Additional Judge of Madhya Pradesh High Court on 25 October 1999 and made permanent on 24 October 2001. He was transferred as Judge of Rajasthan High Court on 11 February 2010. He was transferred as Judge of  Chhattisgarh High Court on 23 April 2012. He was elevated as Chief Justice of Manipur High Court on 23 March 2013. He was transferred as Chief Justice of Gauhati High Court on 19 October 2013. He was elevated as Judge of Supreme Court of India on 13 August 2014. He retired on 27 August 2019.

References 

1954 births
Living people
20th-century Indian judges
Chief Justices of the Gauhati High Court
People from Jabalpur
Justices of the Supreme Court of India
Chief Justices of Manipur High Court
21st-century Indian judges